Robbie Gringras is a British-born Israeli writer, performer, and educator.

Robbie is a motivational speaker who performs internationally as far as Australia, Germany, Hong Kong, USA, and Israel. His shows revolve around the theme of complexity of love and understanding of Israel and Judaism.

Background and Performances 

A British-born Oxford University graduate, Gringras is a writer, actor, singer and storyteller who now lives in Israel on Kibbutz Tuval.

Through theater and music, Robbie Gringras expresses his passion for the land of Israel (which he and his family made Aliyah to in 1996) and artistically shares his passion with his audiences. He is able to do this with his talents of directing, writing, acting, and story telling. One of his productions is called, That’s Why I’m (Still) Here, in which he tells a series of stories about his adjustment to Israel – when he moved there, the significance of why he did, and why he is still there today. His performance provides a new perspective of the land of Israel, and what it means to live there. “In the end aliyah isn’t about arriving. It’s about staying...”, he says.

Gringras drew attention for his 2009 performance piece The Eighth Child,  penned as a response to Caryl Churchill's controversial play, Seven Jewish Children.

One of the songs he performs in this show (with friend musician, Adam Mader), is written by Ehud Banai, called Hayom, meaning "Today." Robbie Gringras calls it an “…honest love song. When you’ve landed and you’ve moved forward to the next phase of this honest relationship.” The relationship he refers to in this sweet melody is one’s relationship with Israel, and how just like in a romance between two people, Israel can be emotionally connected with at many levels. 
Other stories that Gringras tells in this performance are called Kissing through a Handkerchief – what happens when two cultures clash; The Arab and the Jew – the pain and humanity of the conflict between them; Chesed and Din – the overflowing love from Israeli Chutzpah; and An Unbeliever in the Holy City – a tale of a Yom Kippur in Jerusalem. San Francisco BJE and Israel Education Initiative describe Robbie Gringras and his work, "Robbie's work is delightful, and of great significance in helping build intimate, honest, [and] open relations between Israel and Diaspora".

The Goal 

When asked about the main message he wishes to deliver in his shows, Gringras replied, “I don’t believe in messages. It is my belief that good art (and good education) is about setting fire to important questions, and not giving self-important answers. I also believe that good art allows for an audience to assume and to interpret many different messages. The fun of art is that many people can draw from it so many different things.”
Part of Robbie Gringras’s performance art is to show Jewish people how they can connect to the land of Israel. Historically, many artists, musicians, and actors have used performance art to create interest in Israel. Similar figures who have done this include artists Theodore Bikel, Amos Oz, and David D’Or. 
One of the main goals of Gringras’s shows is to engage his audiences into deep thinking about their connection to Judaism and Israel. He believes it is important to motivate individuals by asking pertinent questions and not necessarily by offering what he terms, “self-important answers.”  According to a May 2006 Jewish Exponent article, Gringras describes himself as, "an educator trying to build intimate and emotional connections to modern Israel. American Jews are having a difficult time coming to grips with the gritty reality. We have to get up close and personal with contemporary Israel".

Robbie Gringras’s Network 

Robbie Gringras is also the chief editor and artist in residence of the online network, Makom. Makom is translated as “place” and in Judaism is another name for God – Its goal is to get others to recognize the necessary effort to restore and preserve where Israel stands in Jewish life. The site includes a popular and active book club, which Gringras created with musician Kobi Oz. Gringras says, “Makom believes that every Jew in the world should embrace the complexities of Israel in order to reach a deep and passionate commitment to Israel’s well-being. We create materials [that help] train teachers and other leaders [in writing] articles in the general media about this complexity.”

References

External links
 Personal website

Israeli male stage actors
Israeli male dramatists and playwrights
Living people
Year of birth missing (living people)
Alumni of the University of Oxford
Place of birth missing (living people)